Drone music, drone-based music, or simply drone, is a minimalist genre that emphasizes the use of sustained sounds, notes, or tone clusters – called drones. It is typically characterized by lengthy audio programs with relatively slight harmonic variations throughout each piece. La Monte Young, one of its 1960s originators, defined it in 2000 as "the sustained tone branch of minimalism". Elements of drone music have been incorporated in diverse genres such as rock, ambient, and techno.

Overview
Music which contains drones and is rhythmically still or very slow, called "drone music", can be found in many parts of the world, including bagpipe traditions, among them Scottish pibroch piping; didgeridoo music in Australia, South Indian classical Carnatic music and Hindustani classical music (both of which are accompanied almost invariably by the Tanpura, a plucked, four-string instrument which is only capable of playing a drone); the sustained tones found in the Japanese gagaku classical tradition; possibly (disputed) in pre-polyphonic organum vocal music of late medieval Europe; and the Byzantine chant's ison (or drone-singing, attested after the fifteenth century). Repetition of tones, supposed to be in imitation of bagpipes, is found in a wide variety of genres and musical forms.

The modern genre also called drone music (called "dronology" by some books, labels and stores, to differentiate it from ethnic drone-based music) is often applied to artists who have allied themselves closely with underground music and the post-rock or experimental music genres. Drone music forms a part of the movement referred to as minimal music.

Pitchfork Media and Allmusic journalist Mark Richardson defined it thus:

Development
Composer La Monte Young (born 1935) is an important figure in drone music. He described himself as fascinated from a young age by droning sounds, such as "the sound of the wind blowing", the "60 cycle per second drone [of] step-down transformers on telephone poles", the tanpura drone and the alap of Indian classical music, "certain static aspects of serialism, as in the Webern slow movement of the Symphony Opus 21", and Japanese gagaku "which has sustained tones in it in the instruments such as the Sho". Young started writing music incorporating sustained tones in 1957 with the middle section of For Brass, then in 1958 what he describes as "the first work in the history of music that is completely composed of long sustained tones and silences" with Trio for Strings, before exploring this drone music within the Theatre of Eternal Music that he founded in 1962.

The Theatre of Eternal Music is a multi-media performance group who, in its 1960s–1970s heyday included at various times La Monte Young, Marian Zazeela, Tony Conrad, Angus MacLise, Terry Jennings, John Cale, Billy Name, Jon Hassell, Alex Dea and others, each from various backgrounds (classical composition and performance, painting, mathematics, poetry, jazz, etc.). Operating from the world of lofts and galleries in New York in the mid-sixties to the mid-seventies in particular, and tied to the aesthetics of Fluxus and the post-John Cage-continuum, the group gave performances on the East Coast of the United States as well as in Western Europe. These performances comprised long periods of sensory inundation with combinations of harmonic relationships, which moved slowly from one to the next by means of "laws" laid out by Young regarding "allowable" sequences and simultaneities, perhaps in imitation of Hindustani classical music which he, Zazeela and the others either studied or at least admired. The group released nothing during their lifetime (although Young and Zazeela issued a collaborative LP in 1969, and Young contributed in 1970 one side of a flexi-disc accompanying Aspen magazine). The concerts themselves were influential on their own upon the art world including Karlheinz Stockhausen (whose Stimmung bears their influence most strikingly) and the drone-based minimalist works of dozens of other composers many of whom made parallel innovations including Young classmate Pauline Oliveros, or Eliane Radigue, Charlemagne Palestine, Yoshi Wada, Phill Niblock and many others.

In 2000, La Monte Young wrote: "[About] the style of music that I originated, I believe that the sustained tone branch of minimalism, also known as 'drone music', is a fertile area for exploration."

Drone in rock music
Theatre of Eternal Music member John Cale extended and popularized drone techniques in 1960s rock music with his next band, the Velvet Underground (along with songwriter Lou Reed). The Velvet Underground's first EP release in 1966, entitled Loop, was an experimental drone piece created by member John Cale. This rare release was far removed from the band's usual rock-based music, and its use of drone elements in songs was particularly apparent in the song "Heroin", which consisted of Cale's grinding viola drone with Reed's two-chord guitar figure. This song, appearing on the band's first album The Velvet Underground & Nico (1967), laid the foundation for drone music as a rock music genre in close proximity to the art-world project of the Theatre of Eternal Music. Cale's departure from the Velvet Underground in 1968 blurred matters considerably, as Reed continued to play primitive figures (sometimes in reference to R&B), while Cale went on to produce Stooges' 1969 debut album,  the final mix included his viola drone on the track "We Will Fall". That same year Cale also performed viola on Nico's The Marble Index (1969), on the track "Frozen Warnings". Later, Lou Reed issued in 1975 a double LP of multi-tracked electric-guitar feedback entitled Metal Machine Music which listed (misspelling included) "Drone cognizance and harmonic possibilities vis a vis Lamont Young's Dream Music" among its "Specifications".

In the late 1960s and early 1970s, German rock musicians such as Can, Neu!, Kraftwerk, Cluster and Faust drew from 1960s rock groups that experimented with duration and repetition—for example the Velvet Underground, Pink Floyd, and Captain Beefheart at his most collagic—and from composers such as Karlheinz Stockhausen and La Monte Young. These krautrock groups influenced art rock contemporaries in their own day and punk rock and post-punk players subsequently. Tony Conrad, of the Theatre of Eternal Music, notably made a collaborative LP with Faust which included nothing but two sides of complex violin drones accompanied by a single note on bass guitar and some percussion. Single-note bass-lines also featured on Can's track "Mother Sky" (album Soundtracks, 1970) and the entirety of Die Krupps's first album (1979).

British band Spacemen 3 recorded a live 45-minute drone album entitled Dreamweapon: An Evening of Contemporary Sitar Music, with liner notes by La Monte Young.

New age, cosmic and ambient music
Across North America and Europe, some musicians sought to reconcile Asian classicalism, austere minimalism and folk music's consonant aspects in the service of spirituality. Among them was Theatre of Eternal Music alumnus Terry Riley, with his 1964 In C. Along with La Monte Young and Zazeela, Riley had become a disciple of the Hindustani classical singer Pandit Pran Nath. In parallel, then-Krautrock band Tangerine Dream and its recently departed member Klaus Schulze moved toward a more contemplative and consonant harmonic music, each releasing their own drone music album on the label Ohr in August 1972 (Zeit and Irrlicht, respectively). Throughout the 1970s, Irv Teibel released his psychoacoustic Environments series, which consisted of 30-minute, uninterrupted environmental sound and synthesized soundscapes ("Om Chant" and "Tintinnabulation").

Meanwhile, as an increasingly elaborate studio technology was born during the 1970s, Brian Eno, an alumnus of the glam/art-rock band Roxy Music, postulated (drawing in part from John Cage and his antecedent Erik Satie's 1910s concept of furniture music and in part from minimalists such as La Monte Young) that ambient music was "able to accommodate many levels of listening attention without enforcing one in particular; it must be as ignorable as it is interesting". While Eno's late 1970s ambient tape-music recordings are not drone music, his acknowledgment of Young ("the daddy of us all") and his own influence on later drone music made him an undeniable link in the chain.

Klaus Wiese was a master of the Tibetan singing bowls; he created an extensive series of album releases using them, making impressive acoustic drones.

Examples

See also
 Drone metal alias Drone doom – a subgenre of heavy metal and doom metal
 Space music – some drone music falls under this umbrella genre

Notes

References
 Boon, Marcus, "The Eternal Drone" originally published as "The eternal drone: good vibrations, ancient to future" in The Wire book: Rob Young (ed.), Undercurrents: The Hidden Wiring of Modern Music, ed. Rob Young, London: Continuum Books, 2002,  — History and analysis of drone music from medieval Europe to 1960s La Monte Young (who helped with the article) to 1990s Coil (band).
 Cook, Nicholas & Pople, Anthony, The Cambridge History of Twentieth-century Music, Cambridge University Press, 2004, 
 Cox, Christoph & Warner, Daniel (eds) & al., Audio Culture: Readings in Modern Music, Continuum International, 2004, 
 DRAM (Database of Recorded American Music), "Drone in American Minimalist Music" (Archive.org copy should be available in February 2009), by Nate Wooley, August 1, 2008. — Short history with six online drone pieces (available from accredited institutions or with a library login).
 Levaux, Christophe, "Démesures. Une histoire du drone des 1960 à nos jours", Interval(le)s No 7 (2015): Réinventer le rythme / Den Rhythmus neu denken.
 Potter, Keith, Four Musical Minimalists: La Monte Young, Terry Riley, Steve Reich, Philip Glass, Cambridge University Press, 2002 (rev. pbk from 2000 hbk), 
 Textura, "Drones: Theatres of Eternal Music" (Archive.org copy of 2008), Textura No. 5, February 2005, textura.org. (Also printed as "On and On and On...: The drone & modern music" in Grooves No. 16, 2005) — Definition, history, further reading, records list, links.
 Young, La Monte, "Notes on The Theatre of Eternal Music and The Tortoise, His Dreams and Journeys" (original PDF file), 2000, Mela Foundation, www.melafoundation.org — Historical account and musical essay where Young explains why he considers himself the originator of the style vs. Tony Conrad and John Cale.
 Zuckerman, Gabrielle (ed.), "An Interview with La Monte Young and Marian Zazeela" (Archive.org copy of 2006), American Public Media, July 2002, musicmavericks.publicradio.org — Text transcript with audio version available.

Further reading
 Biron, D. 2015. The Democratic Drone. Overland, 20 October.

External links
 Online playlist of 6 drone pieces (available from accredited institutions or with a library login) at the Database of Recorded American Music (from Pauline Oliveros, Alvin Lucier, Phill Niblock, Charlemagne Palestine, Ellen Fullman, and Eliane Radigue)
 Online playlist of 10+ drone-based pieces (MP3) at Avant-Avant (from Theatre of Eternal Music, MacLise/Conrad/Cale, Sunn O))), etc.)

Minimalism
Ambient music
20th-century classical music
Contemporary classical music
Experimental music genres
Electronic music genres